Ausgrid is an electricity distribution company which owns, maintains and operates the electrical networks supplying 1.8 million customers servicing more than 4 million people in Sydney, the Central Coast and Hunter regions of New South Wales, Australia. It was formed in 2011 from the previously state-owned energy retailer/distributor, EnergyAustralia, when the retail division of the company, along with the EnergyAustralia brand, was sold by the Government of New South Wales, and the remainder renamed Ausgrid.

Ownership
Ausgrid was wholly owned by the Government of New South Wales from 2011 to 2016. In 2016, the New South Wales Government offered the effective sale of a 50.4% stake in Ausgrid, through a 99-year lease. Initial bidding was won by a consortium of State Grid Corporation of China and Cheung Kong Infrastructure Holdings.  On 11 August 2016 the Federal Government intervened to block the proposal, citing national security concerns regarding foreign ownership of critical infrastructure. In September 2016 the New South Wales Government instead accepted a bid from an Australian-based consortium of AustralianSuper and IFM Investors, for a sum of $16 billion.

History
Ausgrid has received numerous complaints and requests for better stakeholder management and consultation of the local community. Ausgrid was seen as forcing their network capacity increasing (and therefore profit increasing) projects onto local residential communities. Affected residents groups from the suburbs of Leichhardt, Penshurst and East Lindfield protested against proposed electricity infrastructure being installed in front of their residential homes without proper consultation or response to complaints by the community. The residents, after many urgent appeals to Ausgrid's COO Trevor Armstrong and the chairman Roger Massey-Green, had been given no other option to notify local MP's, the media, the Environmental Protection Authority and other authorities to get action against Ausgrid.

Accusations were also made of Ausgrid "gold plating" its business at the expense of consumers to increase the price in privatisation.  Ausgrid undertook the rapid replacement of its fleet of vehicles.

See also

 Sydney County Council

References

External links 
ausgrid.com.au

Companies based in Sydney
Companies established in 2011
Government-owned companies of New South Wales
Electric power distribution network operators in Australia
2011 establishments in Australia
Privately held companies of Australia